Julia Eleanor Kobick (born 1983) is an American lawyer serving as deputy state solicitor in the Office of the Massachusetts Attorney General. She is the nominee to serve as a United States district judge of the United States District Court for the District of Massachusetts.

Education 

Kobick earned a Bachelor of Arts from Harvard University in 2005 and a Juris Doctor from Harvard Law School in 2010.

Career 

From 2005 to 2007, Kobick was a second and third grade teacher at P.S. 86, Kingsbridge Heights Elementary School; during the same period she was a corps members with Teach For America.  From 2007 to 2011, she was a resident tutor at Cabot House. She served as a summer associate during the summer of 2009 with Hogan Lovells.  Kobick served as a law clerk for Judge F. Dennis Saylor IV of the United States District Court for the District of Massachusetts in 2010 and 2011, Judge Michael Chagares of the United States Court of Appeals for the Third Circuit in 2011 and 2012, and Associate Justice Ruth Bader Ginsburg of the United States Supreme Court in 2012 and 2013. From 2013 to 2021, she served as a deputy attorney general in the Office of the Massachusetts Attorney General. She became deputy state solicitor, the state's title for the deputy solicitor general, in 2021.

Notable cases 

In 2017, Kobick was part of the legal team that sued the Trump Administration for its rollback of the Affordable Care Act's contraceptive coverage mandate.

In 2022, Kobick defended Massachusetts' mask mandate during the COVID-19 pandemic.

In 2022, Kobick was part of the legal team defending Massachusetts' "Right to Repair" law. The law mandated access to car diagnostic and repair systems.

Nomination to district court 

On July 29, 2022, President Joe Biden announced his intent to nominate Kobick to serve as a United States district judge of the United States District Court for the District of Massachusetts. On August 1, 2022, her nomination was sent to the Senate. President Biden nominated Kobick to the seat vacated by Judge William G. Young, who assumed senior status on July 1, 2021. On November 30, 2022, a hearing on her nomination was held before the Senate Judiciary Committee. During her hearing, she was repeatedly questioned by Senator Josh Hawley about an argument she made before the Supreme Court, claiming the Second Amendment did not apply to stun guns because they did not exist when the Amendment was written; an argument which had previously been rejected unanimously by the Court, and which the Court again rejected when she made it. On January 3, 2023, her nomination was returned to the President under Rule XXXI, Paragraph 6 of the United States Senate. She was renominated on January 23, 2023. On February 9, 2023, her nomination was reported out of committee by an 11–10 vote. Her nomination is pending before the United States Senate.

See also
 List of law clerks of the Supreme Court of the United States (Seat 6)

References 

1983 births
Living people
21st-century American women lawyers
21st-century American lawyers
Harvard Law School alumni
Law clerks of the Supreme Court of the United States
Lawyers from Boston
Massachusetts lawyers
People associated with Hogan Lovells
Schoolteachers from New York (state)
Harvard College alumni